Bruce K. Waltke (born August 30, 1930) is an American Reformed evangelical professor of Old Testament and Hebrew. He has held professorships in the Old Testament at Dallas Theological Seminary, Regent College in Vancouver, British Columbia, Westminster Theological Seminary in Philadelphia, Pennsylvania, Reformed Theological Seminary in Orlando, Florida, and Knox Theological Seminary in Ft. Lauderdale, Florida.

Life 
Waltke was born in New Jersey to parents in the Mennonite Brethren tradition.  He received an A.B. from Houghton College, a Th.M. and Th.D. from Dallas Theological Seminary, and a Ph.D. from Harvard University. He has served as president of the Evangelical Theological Society, was on the translation committee of the New American Standard Bible and New International Version, and is an honorary member of the committee responsible for Today's New International Version.

Waltke's books include Intermediate Hebrew Grammar, Introduction to Biblical Hebrew Syntax, Finding the Will of God: A Pagan Notion? (Eerdmans, 2016), Creation and Chaos, and commentaries on Proverbs (New International Commentary on the Old Testament, 2 vols.), Micah (Tyndale Commentary Series), and with C. J. Fredricks Genesis (Zondervan 2001), which was a winner of the 2002 Gold Medallion Book Award. He was co-editor for the Theological Wordbook of the Old Testament, and he was the Old Testament editor for the Expositor's Bible Commentary series, the New Geneva Study Bible, and the Spirit of the Reformation Study Bible. He wrote An Old Testament Theology: An Exegetical, Canonical, and Thematic Approach, which received an ECPA Christian Book Award in 2008.

Waltke has travelled widely as a Bible expositor, as an area supervisor for excavations at Gezer, Israel, and as the director of field study trips to the Middle East and the Classical world. He is married and has three grown children.

A festschrift entitled The Way of Wisdom: Essays in Honor of Bruce K. Waltke (Zondervan, 2000) was edited by J. I. Packer and Sven K. Soderlund.

In April 2010, news reports emerged alleging that Waltke was asked to resign his professorship at the Reformed Theological Seminary because he advocated that evolution and Christianity were compatible in a video on the Biologos Foundation's website. However, the RTS chancellor, Ric Cannada, later stated that this was not the case and that Waltke had submitted his resignation without solicitation. Waltke himself clarified things: "Ric's acceptance of my resignation has only added to the emotional turmoil; I have received letters from many quarters condemning RTS for his action. In fact, I was asked to be interviewed about my resignation on ABC News with Diane Sawyer! Of course, I refused because I am certain it would have been spun to reflect negatively on RTS and the church. I find no fault with the RTS administration; in fact, I think they did the right thing."

Waltke now serves with the clergy at an ACNA Anglican parish in Washington.

Works

Thesis

Books

 - in 2 volumes

 - Waltke served as OT editor.

 - retitling of the New Geneva Study Bible.

Articles and chapters

Training course

Festschrift

References

External links
Faculty page at Knox Theological Seminary
Lectures by Waltke from Regent Radio at Regent College
Lectures by Waltke at ReformedSermons.org
Advent Anglican, where Waltke currently serves

Living people
American Calvinist and Reformed theologians
People from Orlando, Florida
Harvard University alumni
Westminster Theological Seminary faculty
Dallas Theological Seminary alumni
Dallas Theological Seminary faculty
20th-century Calvinist and Reformed theologians
Old Testament scholars
American biblical scholars
Translators of the Bible into English
1930 births
Christian Hebraists
Former Christian creationists
Houghton University alumni
20th-century translators
American Anglican Church in North America priests
Evangelical Anglican biblical scholars
Academic staff of Regent College